John Watts  (born April 23, 1944) is a retired American judoka who competed at the 1972 Olympics in the open weight category. Watts weighed 280 lbs when he started training in judo in August 1966  and that year entered the Air Force Championships where he defeated Paul Maruyama. Watts was quickly promoted to brown belt, and placed in the 1967 US Nationals. He also competed in the International Military Sports Council games.

John Watts was born in Texas and played football there. He was offered a scholarship to play football by Grambling and Florida A&M but chose to join the Air Force.

References

Living people
1944 births
Olympic judoka of the United States
Judoka at the 1972 Summer Olympics
American male judoka
People from Jefferson, Texas